Edward Rummel (c. 1838 – September 7, 1894) was the 15th Secretary of State of Illinois from 1869 to 1873. His tenure is notable for devising a more systematic method of record keeping that was required by the role of Illinois Secretary of State along with recommending a manual of state government.

Early life 
Rummel was born in Baden, Germany in 1838 and later immigrated to America at the age of 13. Shortly after arriving in America, he took up an apprenticeship with a printer based out of Chicago. Rummel would then later go on to become editor of the Chicago Republican.

In 1958, Rummel moved from Chicago to Peoria, where he shortly thereafter became co-owner of a newspaper named the Illinois Banner. Two years later, in 1960, he renamed the newspaper to Die Peoria Deutsche Zeitung, which persisted until 1878, at which point it was consolidated into a larger publication along with several other local newspapers.

Political career 
Rummel was elected as the Secretary of State of Illinois in 1869 and is remembered for reducing the cost of public printing as well as his immense dedication to records management.

References

1838 births
1894 deaths
Illinois Democrats
Illinois Republicans
Secretaries of State of Illinois
19th-century American politicians